Noda is a village and municipality in the Lerik Rayon of Azerbaijan.  It has a population of 1,215.  The municipality consists of the villages of Noda and Aşağı Bilnə.

References 

Populated places in Lerik District